Journey to the Land Of... Enchantment is the third album by Detroit, Michigan-based R&B group Enchantment. Released in 1979, this album charted at number twenty-five on the R&B albums chart in 1979. This was their last album for Roadshow Records before moving on to RCA Records the following year.

Track listing

Charts

Singles

References

External links
 

1979 albums
Enchantment (band) albums
United Artists Records albums